Kites is the sixth studio album by British progressive/experimental rock band Jade Warrior released in 1976 by Island Records. Kites, more layered and complex than Waves, the duo's previous outing, took nine months to record.

Style 
Kites presented the band "at their most musically abstract and progressive", featuring a larger number of guest musicians than any previous album. Each side here is a long concept piece: side A – Jon Field's side (partly inspired by abstract artist Paul Klee's painting "The Kingdom of the Air", otherwise meaning to convey the sounds of a kite drifting through skies), on side B, driven by Tony Duhig, the wandering Zen boat monk Teh Ch'eng in 9th century China provided a conceptual focus.

Reception

Casey Elston of AllMusic described the result as "dense and dramatic" and a "rare example of intense ambient sound".

Track listing

Personnel 
 Tony Duhig – guitars, percussion, keyboards, production
 Jon Field – flutes, guitar, percussion, production

Studio guests 
 Roger Bryson – piano
 Fred Frith – violin
 Pete Gibson – brass, horn
 Coleridge Goode – bass guitar
 Debbie Hall – violin
 Jeff Westley – electric piano
 Graham Morgan – drums
 Joe O'Donnell – violin
 Clodagh Simonds – vocals
 Gowan Turnbull – saxophone
 Geoff Westley – piano
 Willie – drums, percussion
 Elmo – Mexican foot drums

Production 
 Tom Newman – audio engineer, engineer
 David Platt – liner notes
 Mark Powell – reissue producer
 Paschal Byrne – digital remastering, remastering
 George Chkiantz – audio engineer, engineer
 Hugh Gilmour – package design

References 

1976 albums
Jade Warrior (band) albums
Island Records albums